Levorphanol (brand name Levo-Dromoran) is an opioid medication used to treat moderate to severe pain. It is the levorotatory enantiomer of the compound racemorphan. Its dextrorotatory counterpart is dextrorphan.

It was first described in Germany in 1946. The drug has been in medical use in the United States since 1953.

Pharmacology
Levorphanol acts predominantly as an agonist of the μ-opioid receptor (MOR), but is also an agonist of the δ-opioid receptor (DOR), κ-opioid receptor (KOR), and the nociceptin receptor (NOP), as well as an NMDA receptor antagonist and a serotonin-norepinephrine reuptake inhibitor (SNRI). Levorphanol, similarly to certain other opioids, also acts as a glycine receptor antagonist and GABA receptor antagonist at very high concentrations. Levorphanol is 6 to 8 times as potent as morphine at the MOR.

Relative to morphine, levorphanol lacks complete cross-tolerance and possesses greater intrinsic activity at the MOR. The duration of action is generally long compared to other comparable analgesics and varies from 4 hours to as much as 15 hours. For this reason levorphanol is useful in palliation of chronic pain and similar conditions. Levorphanol has an oral to parenteral effectiveness ratio of 2:1, one of the most favorable of the strong narcotics. Its antagonism of the NMDA receptor, similar to those of the phenylheptylamine open-chain opioids such as methadone or the phenylpiperidine ketobemidone, make levorphanol useful for types of pain that other analgesics may not be as effective against, such as neuropathic pain. Levorphanol's exceptionally high analgesic efficacy in the treatment of neuropathic pain is also conferred by its action on serotonin and norepinephrine transporters, similar to the opioids tramadol and tapentadol, and mutually complements the analgesic effect of its NMDA receptor antagonism.

Levorphanol shows a high rate of psychotomimetic side effects such as hallucinations and delirium, which have been attributed to its binding to and activation of the KOR. At the same time however, activation of this receptor as well as of the DOR have been determined to contribute to its analgesic effects.

Chemistry

Chemically, levorphanol belongs to the morphinan class and is (−)-3-hydroxy-N-methyl-morphinan. It is the "left-handed" (levorotatory) stereoisomer of racemorphan, the racemic mixture of the two stereoisomers with differing pharmacology. The "right-handed" (dextrorotatory) enantiomer of racemorphan is dextrorphan (DXO), an antitussive, potent dissociative hallucinogen (NMDA receptor antagonist), and weakly active opioid. DXO is an active metabolite of the pharmaceutical drug dextromethorphan (DXM), which, analogously to DXO, is an enantiomer of the racemic mixture racemethorphan along with levomethorphan, the latter of which has similar properties to those of levorphanol.

Society and culture

Name
Levorphanol is the INN, BAN, and DCF. As the medically used tartrate salt, the drug is also known as levorphanol tartrate (USAN, BANM). The former developmental code name of levorphanol at Roche was Ro 1-5431.

Availability
As the tartrate salt, levorphanol is marketed by Sentynl Therapeutics and Virtus Pharmaceuticals in the U.S., and Canada under the brand name Levo-Dromoran.

Legality
Levorphanol is listed under the Single Convention On Narcotic Drugs 1961 and is regulated like morphine in most countries. In the U.S., it is a Schedule II Narcotic controlled substance with a DEA ACSCN of 9220 and 2013 annual aggregate manufacturing quota of 4.5 kilos. The salts in use are the tartrate (free base conversion ratio 0.58) and hydrobromide (0.76).

See also 
 Cough syrup
 Racemorphan; Dextrorphan;
 Noscapine
 Codeine; Pholcodine
 Dextromethorphan; Dimemorfan
 Butamirate
 Pentoxyverine
 Tipepidine
 Cloperastine; Levocloperastine

References 

Delta-opioid receptor agonists
Dissociative drugs
Enantiopure drugs
Euphoriants
GABA receptor antagonists
German inventions
Glycine receptor antagonists
Kappa-opioid receptor agonists
Morphinans
Mu-opioid receptor agonists
NMDA receptor antagonists
Nociceptin receptor agonists
Phenols
Serotonin–norepinephrine reuptake inhibitors
Synthetic opioids